Black Rock Bridge is a historic concrete arch bridge carrying Pennsylvania Route 113 across the Schuylkill River between Phoenixville, Chester County, Pennsylvania, and Upper Providence Township, Montgomery County, Pennsylvania. The bridge was constructed in 1927, and features open-spandrel arches and solid concrete parapet walls.

It was listed on the National Register of Historic Places in 1988.

References 

Road bridges on the National Register of Historic Places in Pennsylvania
Bridges completed in 1907
Bridges in Chester County, Pennsylvania
Bridges in Montgomery County, Pennsylvania
Bridges over the Schuylkill River
Concrete bridges in Pennsylvania
National Register of Historic Places in Chester County, Pennsylvania
National Register of Historic Places in Montgomery County, Pennsylvania
Open-spandrel deck arch bridges in the United States